Dran is a surname. Notable people with the surname include:

 André Dran (1924–2014), French tenor
 Damon Dran, fictional character 
 Henri François Le Dran (1685–1770), French surgeon

See also
 Glaub dran, 1993 album by Lessmann/Ziller